Behind the Iron Curtain is a live album released by German singer Nico in 1986. It features a concert recorded at De Doelen Concertgebouw, Grote Zaal (Great Hall), in Rotterdam, the Netherlands on 9 October 1985. The concert was held as part of the Pandora's Music Box music festival.

Although the release states it was "recorded live in Warsaw, Budapest and Prague between 29.9.85 and 31.10.85"—thus behind the Iron Curtain—it was in fact entirely recorded at the one concert in Rotterdam.

The album was released on CD in 1987 excluding the material from side three.

Track listing
All songs were written by Nico, except where noted.
Side one
 "All Saints' Night" (Nico, Eric Random, Toby Toman, James Young) – 9:14
 "Procession" – 3:48
 "Secret Side" – 3:33
 "Das Lied vom einsamen Mädchen" (Robert Gilbert, Werner R. Heymann) – 6:08
Side two
"Win a Few" – 8:55
 "König" – 4:27
 "Purple Lips" – 4:32
 "All Tomorrow's Parties" (Lou Reed) –  3:03
Side three
"Fearfully in Danger" – 6:49
 "The End" (The Doors) – 10:10
 "My Funny Valentine" (Richard Rodgers, Lorenz Hart) – 4:15
 "Sixty/Forty" – 2:26
Side four

"Tananore" – 4:06
 "Janitor of Lunacy" – 4:19
 "My Heart Is Empty" – 5:15
 "Femme Fatale" (Reed) – 3:48

Personnel
 Nico – vocals, Indian pump organ
 James Young – piano, keyboards
 Eric Random – tabla, percussion, synthesiser
 Graham 'Dids' Dowdall – electronic percussion
 Toby Toman – drums

References

External links

http://smironne.free.fr/NICO/iron.php

Nico albums
1986 live albums